Abū Yaʿlā Ḥamzah ibn al-Asad ibn al-Qalānisī (c. 1071 – 18 March 1160) was an Arab politician and chronicler in 12th-century Damascus.

Biography
Abu Ya‘la ('father of Ya‘la'), whose surname was al-Qalanisi ('the Hatter'), descended from the Banu Tamim tribe, and was among the well-educated nobility of the city of Damascus. He studied literature, theology, and law, and served firstly as a secretary in, and later the head of, the chancery of Damascus (the Diwan al-Rasa'il). He served twice as ra'is of the city, an office equivalent to mayor.

"Chronicle of Damascus"
His chronicle, the Dhail or Mudhayyal Ta'rikh Dimashq ('Continuation of the Chronicle of Damascus') was an extension of the chronicle of Hilal bin al-Muhassin al-Sabi', covering the years 1056 to al-Qalanisi's death in 1160. This chronicle is one of the few contemporary accounts of the First Crusade and its immediate aftermath from the Muslim perspective, making it not only a valuable source for modern historians, but also for later 12th-century chronicles, including Ali ibn al-Athir. He also witnessed the siege of Damascus in 1148 during the Second Crusade, which ended in a decisive crusader defeat.

The entire material of his chronicle covers the time span of two generations, his father's and his own, al-Qalanisi having experienced the First Crusade at a mature age, although apparently not as a fighter. Analysing the text, H. A. R. Gibb, his first English translator, reaches the conclusion that al-Qalanisi has extracted his information both from eyewitnesses and documents, a fact strengthened by al-Qalanisi's own description of his modus operandi. As a result of al-Qalanisi's careful work, a chief quality noted by Gibb is the accuracy of the chronology of events, for which he even offers the day of the week.

Gibb extracted from the chronicle and translated to English the material covering the period 1097–1159, which he published in 1932.

References

Sources

 

1160 deaths
12th-century Syrian historians
People from Damascus
Medieval writers about the Crusades
12th-century Arab historians
Year of birth uncertain